Itamonte is a city in the south of Minas Gerais, Brazil. Its population was 15,714 (2020) and its area is 432 km².

Location

Itamonte is a touristic city in the Serra da Mantiqueira mountains. The territorial area is 430,597 km² big. The city's current mayor is Alexandre Augusto Moreira Santos, with Marcia Castilho being deputy mayor.

The municipality contains 34.54% of the  Serra do Papagaio State Park, created in 1998.

External links
Rota Turismo - Agencia de Viagens
- Rota Turismo Travel Agency
Associacao de hoteis de Itamonte
Itamonte
Portal ITAMONTE.NET - MG

References

Municipalities in Minas Gerais